The Montebello railway station is a railway station on the Rome–Civitacastellana–Viterbo railway, located in Rome (Italy), outside the Grande Raccordo Anulare, in the zone Prima Porta (Z. LVIII).

History 
The station came into operation on February 13, 2006 as a terminus of the urban railway service as well as an interchange with vehicles on wheels.

Description 
The station consists of 3 tracks:
tracks 1 and 2, with boarding-level platforms, for urban trains to and from Piazzale Flaminio which terminate in Montebello.
track 3 for suburban trains.

Services 
The station has:
 Ticket office
 Pay park-and-ride with 352 parking places (of which 8 reserved for the disabled)

Interchanges 
 Terminal of ATAC bus lines
Weekdays and holidays: C1
Saturdays and holidays only: C5

Surroundings 
Cimitero Flaminio (also known as Cimitero di Montebello or Cimitero di Prima Porta).

Notes

External links 
 

Montebello